Lattice-based cryptography is the generic term for constructions of cryptographic primitives that involve lattices, either in the construction itself or in the security proof. Lattice-based constructions are currently important candidates for post-quantum cryptography.  Unlike more widely used and known public-key schemes such as the RSA, Diffie-Hellman or elliptic-curve cryptosystems—which could, theoretically, be defeated using Shor's algorithm on a quantum computer—some lattice-based constructions appear to be resistant to attack by both classical and quantum computers. Furthermore, many lattice-based constructions are considered to be secure under the assumption that certain well-studied computational lattice problems cannot be solved efficiently.

History
In 1996, Miklós Ajtai introduced the first lattice-based cryptographic construction whose security could be based on the hardness of well-studied lattice problems, and Cynthia Dwork showed that a certain average-case lattice problem, known as Short Integer Solutions (SIS), is at least as hard to solve as a worst-case lattice problem. She then showed a cryptographic hash function whose security is equivalent to the computational hardness of SIS.

In 1998, Jeffrey Hoffstein, Jill Pipher, and Joseph H. Silverman introduced a lattice-based public-key encryption scheme, known as NTRU. However, their scheme is not known to be at least as hard as solving a worst-case lattice problem.

The first lattice-based public-key encryption scheme whose security was proven under worst-case hardness assumptions was introduced by  Oded Regev in 2005, together with the Learning with Errors problem (LWE). Since then, much follow-up work has focused on improving Regev's security proof and improving the efficiency of the original scheme. Much more work has been devoted to constructing additional cryptographic primitives based on LWE and related problems. For example, in 2009, Craig Gentry introduced the first fully homomorphic encryption scheme, which was based on a lattice problem.

Mathematical background 
In other words, 

Crucially, the basis for a lattice is not unique.

The most important lattice-based computational problem is the Shortest Vector Problem (SVP or sometimes GapSVP), which asks us to approximate the minimal Euclidean length of a non-zero lattice vector. Many (though not all) lattice-based cryptographic constructions are known to be secure if SVP is in fact hard in this regime.

Selected lattice-based schemes
This section presents selected lattice-based schemes, grouped by primitive.

Encryption
Selected schemes for the purpose of encryption:

 GGH encryption scheme, which is based in the closest vector problem (CVP). In 1999, Nguyen published a critical flaw in the scheme's design.
 NTRUEncrypt.

Homomorphic encryption
Selected schemes for the purpose of homomorphic encryption:

 Gentry's original scheme.
 Brakerski and Vaikuntanathan.

Hash functions
Selected schemes for the purpose of hashing:

 SWIFFT.
 Lattice Based Hash Function (LASH).

Key exchange 
Selected schemes for the purpose of key exchange, also called key establishment, key encapsulation and key encapsulation mechanism (KEM):

 CRYSTALS-Kyber, which is built upon module learning with errors (module-LWE). Kyber was selected for standardization by the NIST.
 FrodoKEM, a scheme based on the learning with errors (LWE) problem. FrodoKEM joined the standardization call conducted by the National Institute of Standards and Technology (NIST), and lived up to the 3rd round of the process. It was then discarded due to low performance reasons. In October, 2022, the Twitter account associated to cryptologist Daniel J. Bernstein posted security issues in frodokem640.
 NewHope is based on the ring learning with errors (RLWE) problem.
 NTRU Prime.
 Peikert's work, which is based on the ring learning with errors (RLWE) problem.
 Saber, which is based on the module learning with rounding (module-LWR) problem.

Signing 
Selected schemes for the purpose of digital signatures:

 CRYSTALS-Dilithium or simply Dilithium, which is built upon module learning with errors (module-LWE) and module short integer solution (module-SIS). Dilithium was selected for standardization by the NIST.
 Falcon, which is built upon short integer solution (SIS) over NTRU. Falcon was selected for standardization by the NIST.
 GGH signature scheme.
 Güneysu, Lyubashevsky, and Pöppelmann's work, which is based on ring learning with errors (RLWE).
 MITAKA, a variant of Falcon.
 NTRUSign.
 qTESLA, which is based on ring learning with errors (RLWE). The qTESLA scheme joined the standardization call conducted by the National Institute of Standards and Technology (NIST).

Security 
Lattice-based cryptographic constructions hold a great promise for public-key post-quantum cryptography. Indeed, the main alternative forms of public-key cryptography are schemes based on the hardness of factoring and related problems and schemes based on the hardness of the discrete logarithm and related problems. However, both factoring and the discrete logarithm are known to be solvable in polynomial time on a quantum computer. Furthermore, algorithms for factorization tend to yield algorithms for discrete logarithm, and vice versa. This further motivates the study of constructions based on alternative assumptions, such as the hardness of lattice problems.

Many lattice-based cryptographic schemes are known to be secure assuming the worst-case hardness of certain lattice problems. I.e., if there exists an algorithm that can efficiently break the cryptographic scheme with non-negligible probability, then there exists an efficient algorithm that solves a certain lattice problem on any input. In contrast, cryptographic schemes based on, e.g., factoring would be broken if factoring was easy "on an average input,'' even if factoring was in fact hard in the worst case. However, for the more efficient and practical lattice-based constructions (such as schemes based on NTRU and even schemes based on LWE with more aggressive parameters), such worst-case hardness results are not known. For some schemes, worst-case hardness results are known only for certain structured lattices or not at all.

Functionality 
For many cryptographic primitives, the only known constructions are based on lattices or closely related objects. These primitives include fully homomorphic encryption, indistinguishability obfuscation, cryptographic multilinear maps, and functional encryption.

See also 
 Lattice problems
 Learning with errors
 Homomorphic encryption
 Post-quantum cryptography
 Ring learning with errors
 Ring learning with Errors Key Exchange

References

Bibliography 
 Oded Goldreich, Shafi Goldwasser, and Shai Halevi. "Public-key cryptosystems from lattice reduction problems". In Crypto ’97: Proceedings of the 17th Annual International Cryptology Conference on Advances in Cryptology, pages 112–131, London, UK, 1997. Springer-Verlag.
 Oded Regev. Lattice-based cryptography. In Advances in cryptology (CRYPTO), pages 131–141, 2006.

 
Post-quantum cryptography